Kallie Knoetze (born as Nikolaas Jacobus Knoetze on 24 April 1953) is a retired South African heavyweight boxer and actor.

Boxing career
As an amateur Knoetze fought future professional world champion fellow South African Gerrie Coetzee six times, each winning three bouts.

Knoetze turned professional in 1976, and started his career with six consecutive KO wins. In his seventh fight he was disqualified against Reinaldo Raul Gorosito, and in his eighth bout he lost a ten rounds points decision to Coetzee.

From late 1976 to 1979 he went on an 11-fight winning streak, which included avenging his loss to Gorosito via a ten rounds decision (this was the only bout in the streak that went to the distance) and knocking out US Olympian Duane Bobick and former Muhammad Ali opponent Richard Dunn.

In 1979 he was rated as the number three heavyweight in the world, and fought an elimination bout for the vacant WBA heavyweight belt, but he lost to another US Olympian, John Tate, via a twelfth-round knockout. In the other elimination bout Coetzee defeated Leon Spinks and then went on to lose to Tate for the WBA title himself.

Knoetze never fought for a major title again. He fought seven more bouts, winning four and losing three, before retiring in 1981 after a second-round knockout loss to Robbie Williams.

Acting career
Between 1979 and 1991 Knoetze acted in four movies, his best known role being primary antagonist Rosco Dunn, a former corrupt professional boxer turned to a military sergeant, in the 1982 film Bomber.

Professional boxing record

|-
| style="text-align:center;" colspan="8"|21 Wins (20 knockouts, 1 decisions), 6 Losses (4 knockouts, 2 decision), 0 Draws 
|-  style="text-align:center; background:#e3e3e3;"
|  style="border-style:none none solid solid; "|Result
|  style="border-style:none none solid solid; "|Record
|  style="border-style:none none solid solid; "|Opponent
|  style="border-style:none none solid solid; "|Type
|  style="border-style:none none solid solid; "|Rounds
|  style="border-style:none none solid solid; "|Date
|  style="border-style:none none solid solid; "|Location
|  style="border-style:none none solid solid; "|Notes
|- align=center
|Loss
|21–6
|align=left| Robbie Williams
|TKO
|10
|21 July 1981
|align=left| 
|align=left|
|- align=center
|Win
|21–5
|align=left| John Baca
|KO
|10
|2 May 1981
|align=left| 
|align=left|
|- align=center
|Win
|20–5
|align=left| Bernd August
|RTD
|10
|13 March 1981
|align=left| 
|align=left|
|- align=center
|Loss
|19–5
|align=left| Jimmy Abbott
|TKO
|10
|8 March 1980
|align=left| 
|align=left|
|- align=center
|Loss
|19–4
|align=left| Mike Koranicki
|KO
|10
|19 December 1979
|align=left| 
|align=left|
|- align=center
|Win
|19–3
|align=left| Randy Stephens
|KO
|10
|20 October 1979
|align=left| 
|align=left|
|- align=center
|Win
|18–3
|align=left| George Butzbach
|RTD
|10
|14 September 1979
|align=left| 
|align=left|
|- align=center
|Loss
|17–3
|align=left| John Tate
|TKO
|12
|2 June 1979
|align=left| 
|align=left|
|- align=center
|Win
|17–2
|align=left| Bill Sharkey
|KO
|10
|13 January 1979
|align=left| 
|align=left|
|- align=center
|Win
|16–2
|align=left| G.G. Maldonado
|KO
|10
|26 August 1978
|align=left| 
|align=left|
|- align=center
|Win
|15–2
|align=left| Denton Ruddock
|KO
|10
|1 July 1978
|align=left| 
|align=left|
|- align=center
|Win
|14–2
|align=left| Duane Bobick
|KO
|10
|4 February 1978
|align=left| 
|align=left|
|- align=center
|Win
|13–2
|align=left| Richard Dunn
|KO
|10
|10 September 1977
|align=left| 
|align=left|
|- align=center
|Win
|12–2
|align=left| Mike Schutte
|KO
|10
|13 August 1977
|align=left| 
|align=left|
|- align=center
|Win
|11–2
|align=left| Neville Meade
|KO
|10
|4 June 1977
|align=left| 
|align=left|
|- align=center
|Win
|10–2
|align=left| Ishaq Hussein
|KO
|10
|6 May 1977
|align=left| 
|align=left|
|- align=center
|Win
|9–2
|align=left| Reinaldo Raul Gorosito
|PTS
|10
|4 March 1977
|align=left| 
|align=left|
|- align=center
|Win
|8–2
|align=left| Ngozika Ekwelum
|TKO
|10
|29 January 1977
|align=left| 
|align=left|
|- align=center
|Win
|7–2
|align=left| Jerry Huston Jr
|RTD
|10
|7 December 1976
|align=left| 
|align=left|
|- align=center
|Loss
|6–2
|align=left| Gerrie Coetzee
|PTS
|10
|30 October 1976
|align=left| 
|align=left|
|- align=center
|Loss
|6–1
|align=left| Reinaldo Raul Gorosito
|DQ
|10
|5 October 1976
|align=left| 
|align=left|
|- align=center
|Win
|6–0
|align=left| Frank Schram
|RTD
|10
|13 August 1976
|align=left| 
|align=left|
|- align=center
|Win
|5–0
|align=left| Domingo Silveira
|TKO
|10
|19 June 1976
|align=left| 
|align=left|
|- align=center
|Win
|4–0
|align=left| Amedeo Laureti
|TKO
|10
|21 May 1976
|align=left| 
|align=left|
|- align=center
|Win
|3–0
|align=left| Horst Lang
|KO
|6
|27 March 1976
|align=left| 
|align=left|
|- align=center 
|Win
|2–0
|align=left| Karsten Honhold
|KO
|6
|22 March 1976
|align=left| 
|align=left|
|- align=center
|Win
|1–0
|align=left| Jeffrey Ellis
|KO
|4
|28 February 1976
|align=left| 
|align=left|
|- align=center

References

External links
 
 

1953 births
Living people
Heavyweight boxers
Sportspeople from Pretoria
South African male film actors
South African male boxers